Ana Lía Piñeyrúa Olmos (born 23 November 1954) is a Uruguayan lawyer and politician, belonging to the National Party.

Biography
A member of the National Party, in the 1980s she was an advocate of democracy, fighting against the civic-military dictatorship. In 1989 she was elected to the Parliament.

In 1995, President Julio María Sanguinetti appointed her as Ministry of Labour and Social Welfare in his coalition government; she took part in the reformulation of the Uruguayan pensions system.

She was a regional director for International Labour Organization in 2000–2008.

In 2010 she was once again elected to the Parliament.

References

External links

Living people
1954 births
University of the Republic (Uruguay) alumni
Uruguayan women lawyers
Women government ministers of Uruguay
National Party (Uruguay) politicians
Ministers of Labor and Social Affairs of Uruguay